Legacy Entertainment (formerly The Goddard Group) is a themed entertainment integrator and design firm based in North Hollywood, Los Angeles, California. The company, then known as Gary Goddard Entertainment (GGE) and later the Goddard Group, was formed by Gary Goddard in 2002, after leaving his previous company, Landmark Entertainment Group. Goddard Group reorganized, changed ownership, and was rebranded Legacy Entertainment in 2018 when Gary Goddard left the company following accusations of sexual assault.

Rebranding: Legacy Entertainment 
In 2018 the firm began to transition away from highlighting Gary Goddard as the sole creative force behind its many successful projects, amid accusations of sexual assault, and handed over control of the company to his protégé, Taylor Jeffs. Under Jeffs a transitional name change from the Gary Goddard Entertainment (GGE) to Legacy Entertainment | GGE was adopted. Legacy | GGE would later give way to the final rebranded company name of Legacy Entertainment. The new name also signaled new ownership. Four partners; Taylor Jeffs (Director of Creative), Barry Kemper (Director of Operations), Eric Carnagey (Director of Business), and Marcus King (Director of Projects), emerged as the new owners of the rebranded company.

Projects
Legacy Entertainment has created a number of entertainment projects in a variety of forms, including theme parks, resorts, casinos, retail malls, Broadway shows, and films. The company has designed and developed attractions for clients such as Cirque du Soleil, Universal Studios, Six Flags, Insomniac Events, Haichang Polar Ocean World, Lotte World, Galaxy Entertainment Group, and Melco Resorts & Entertainment.

Lotte World partnership

In 2012, the Goddard Group announced a partnership with South Korea’s Lotte World theme park to create a number of new rides, shows, and attractions. Eight attractions opened as a result of this collaboration, including Jumping Fish, Do You Speak Beluga?, Underland, Brother Moon & Sister Sun’s Tall Tales, The Welcome Center, Let’s Dream! Nighttime Parade, Fairy Trails Dream Boats, and Wild Tours.

Cirque du Soleil partnership

In November 2014, Mexican resort developer Vidanta announced their intention to build and operate the world’s first Cirque du Soleil theme park at its resort in Nuevo Vallarta, Mexico. The Goddard Group is the project’s designer.

In May 2015, Gary Goddard revealed that the Goddard Group and Cirque du Soleil had signed a joint venture partnership agreement that would help expand Cirque into experiential entertainment.

Completed projects list

Awards and patents
In 2009, the Goddard Group was awarded Amusement Todays Golden Ticket Award. They are the first entertainment design firm to win this award.

The Goddard Group's Broadway production of the musical HAIR received the Tony Award for Best Revival of a Musical in 2009.

Gary Goddard is named as the co-inventor on the patents for The Amazing Adventures of Spider-Man ride, Terminator 2: 3D, and Jurassic Park: The Ride.

Goddard's projects have received a total of seven THEA awards.

References

Companies based in California
2002 establishments in California
Companies based in Los Angeles